Pétanque at the 2007 Southeast Asian Games was held in the Pétanque Court in Suranaree University of Technology, Nakhon Ratchasima, Thailand.

Medal tally

Medalists

Men

Women

Mixed

References

Sources 
 https://web.archive.org/web/20190924215918/http://www.seagfoffice.org/pdf/pdf_1450240409_3923.pdf

External links
Southeast Asian Games Official Results

2007 Southeast Asian Games events
2007 in bowls
2007